Jordan Lewis Smith (born 9 November 1992) is an English professional golfer.

Professional career
Smith turned professional in 2014. He played mainly on the PGA EuroPro Tour in 2015 winning twice. He also won the tour's Order of Merit which gained him a Challenge Tour card for 2016. He won two Challenge Tour events in 2016, the Red Sea Egyptian Challenge and the Ras Al Khaimah Golf Challenge. He finished leader of the Challenge Tour Order of Merit to earn a place on the European Tour for 2017.

Smith started the 2022 European Tour season with runner-up finishes at the Ras Al Khaimah Championship and the MyGolfLife Open in South Africa; where he was defeated in a playoff by Pablo Larrazábal on the second extra hole. In October, Smith claimed his second victory on the European Tour at the Portugal Masters, shooting 30-under-par for four rounds (including two rounds of 62) on way to winning by three shots ahead of Gavin Green. It was also a wire-to-wire victory. His aggregate score of 254 and score in relation to par, was better than the European Tour scoring record at the time, however it was considered as an unofficial record due to preferred lies being in place.

Amateur wins
2013 Brabazon Trophy
2014 Hampshire Salver

Source:

Professional wins (7)

European Tour wins (2)

European Tour playoff record (1–1)

Challenge Tour wins (2)

PGA EuroPro Tour wins (2)

Jamega Pro Golf Tour wins (1)

Results in major championships
Results not in chronological order in 2020.

CUT = missed the half-way cut
"T" indicates a tie for a place
NT = No tournament due to COVID-19 pandemic

Results in World Golf Championships

"T" = Tied

Team appearances
Amateur
Walker Cup (representing Great Britain & Ireland): 2013
European Amateur Team Championship (representing England): 2014

Professional
Hero Cup (representing Great Britain & Ireland): 2023

See also
2016 Challenge Tour graduates

References

External links

English male golfers
European Tour golfers
Sportspeople from Bath, Somerset
People from Chippenham
1992 births
Living people